Friends of Friendless Churches is a registered charity formed in 1957, active in England and Wales, which campaigns for and rescues redundant historic places of worship threatened by demolition, decay, or inappropriate conversion.  As of April 2021, the charity owns 58 redundant churches or chapels, 29 of which are in England, and 29 in Wales.

History 
The charity was formed by Ivor Bulmer-Thomas, a writer, former MP and a high church Anglican. He was the charity's Honorary Director until his death in 1993. The first executive committee included prominent politicians, artists, poets and architects, including John Betjeman, John Piper, Roy Jenkins, T. S. Eliot and Harry Goodhart-Rendel. Initially the charity campaigned and obtained grants for the repair and restoration of churches within its remit. The 1968 Pastoral Measure established the Redundant Churches Fund (now called Churches Conservation Trust). However, the Church Commissioners turned down a number of buildings that the executive committee considered worthy of preservation, including Old St Matthew's Church, Lightcliffe, and St Peter's Church, Wickham Bishops. The charity therefore decided in 1972 to change its constitution, allowing it to acquire threatened buildings either by freehold or by lease. The tower of the church at Lightcliffe was the first property to be vested with the charity.

Operations 
The charity raises money from various sources. Since 1999, it has worked in partnership with Cadw and the Church in Wales to take redundant churches in Wales into its care. In Wales, the charity receives funding for taking Anglican churches into its care.  Of this, 70% comes from the Welsh Government through Cadw, and 30% from the Church in Wales.

In England, the charity does not receive regular public funding, but has obtained grants from bodies such as English Heritage. Other funds are raised from donations, membership fees and legacies from members of the public. Some churches have been supported by the formation of local groups of Friends. The charity administers two trusts, one of which, the Cottam Will Trust, was established by Rev S. E. Cottam for "the advancement of religion of objects of beauty to be placed in ancient Gothic churches either in England or Wales".

All the churches owned by the charity are listed buildings, and most are former Anglican churches, either from the Church of England or the Church in Wales, although three were private chapels, one was a Nonconformist chapel and another a Roman Catholic church.

On the charity's 50th anniversary in 2007 it published a book entitled Saving Churches, containing details of their history and accounts of their churches. The charity describes its mission as an architectural conservation organisation which aims to preserve beautiful places of worship as public monuments. The charity told The Guardian newspaper that cared-for and cherished should not mean fossilised, and instead they want offer their places of worship for public events such as concerts, knitting groups, seasonal lectures, art exhibitions, supper clubs and the occasional religious ceremony. "They intend to carry on working tirelessly to preserve what Shakespeare described as our magnificent 'sermons in stone' for generations to come", The Guardian stated.

The Friends have argued against Church of England plans, published in 2021, that would diminish the democracy of the church closure process, and reduce the transparency and accountability of the Church.

People 
The charity's patronage was made vacant following the death of the Marquess of Anglesey in 2013. The ecclesiastical patron is Rev Wyn Evans, former Bishop of St Davids, and the president is the Marquess of Salisbury. 

Rachel Morley has been the director of the charity since 2018, and  there were two members of staff, one part-time.

List of vested churches
The list is in two sections, one for England and the other for Wales.  This division reflects the former management of most of the English churches by the Church of England and of the Welsh churches by the Church in Wales, and the different funding arrangements in the two countries.

Key

England

Wales

Formerly vested churches 
St Peter's, Corpusty, Norfolk was owned from 1982, then transferred into the care of the Norfolk Churches Trust in 2009.

The distinctive characteristic of voluntary sources is that the donor receives nothing in return for the money given. It includes grants from government and other charitable sources, as well as public gifts, donations and legacies.This is the date of first construction of the existing building.

References

External links
 
 
 

Charities based in London
Heritage organisations in the United Kingdom
Lists of churches in England
Lists of churches in Wales
Architectural history

1957 establishments in the United Kingdom
Conservation and restoration of cultural heritage